The 1991 NSL Second Division (known as the OK League for sponsorship reasons) was the seventh edition of the second tier competition organised by the National Soccer League. It was divided into two divisions known as streams.

Streams

O-Stream

K-Stream

Championship playoff

Cape Town Spurs won the Championship.

The New Republic Bank Knockout Cup

A new cup for the NSL Second Divisions teams was introduced in 1991 sponsored by the New Republic Bank. Sixteen clubs in total entered the competition, 8 from each stream.

Cape Town Spurs won the Knockout Cup.

References

1991 in South African sport